Helene Moszkiewiez (20 December 1920 – 18 June 1998) worked within the Belgian Resistance during World War II, and maintained three identities, Jewish, Belgian and German, working for two years as a clerk in Gestapo headquarters in Brussels.

The Germans took control of Belgium when she was 19. Two years earlier she had met a young Belgian soldier in a Brussels library. When she met him again, and he was operating with a different name while wearing a German uniform, she accepted his offer to work within the Belgian Resistance to undermine the Nazis.

Moszkiewiez moved to Canada after the war and wrote her memoirs, Inside the Gestapo: A Jewish Woman's Secret War (Macmillan, 1985). Her story recalls false identity papers, helping POWs escape, working within the Gestapo, hearing screams of SS victims, stealing information to rescue Jews scheduled for transport and killing a Gestapo officer.

Movies 
The story was made into a 1991 TV film, A Woman at War, with Martha Plimpton in the lead role.
Her story also inspired Paul Verhoeven for the movie Zwartboek (Black Book).

References

External links
 
 MOSZKIEWIEZ, Helene 
 Hélène Moszkiewiez

1920 births
1998 deaths
Belgian Jews
Belgian resistance members
Female resistance members of World War II
Jewish resistance members during the Holocaust
Jewish women activists
Jewish women writers